was a German music magazine established by Bartholf Senff in Leipzig in 1843 and ceasing publication in 1941. From 1907 (when the journal was sold to Simrock) to 1919, it was based in Berlin and Leipzig, and from 1920 to 1941 in Berlin. Its music critics included Louis Köhler (1844–86),  (1887–97), Alfred Heuß (1902–05), and Ludwig Karpath.

External links

1843 establishments in Germany
1941 disestablishments in Germany
Defunct magazines published in Germany
German-language magazines
Music magazines published in Germany
Magazines established in 1843
Magazines disestablished in 1941
Magazines published in Berlin
Magazines published in Leipzig